The Challenge Cup is a knockout rugby league cup competition organised by the Rugby Football League, held annually since 1896, with the exception of 1915–1919 and 1939–1940, due to World War I and World War II respectively. It involves amateur, semi-professional and professional clubs.

The final of the Challenge Cup at Wembley Stadium, London, is one of the most prestigious matches in world rugby league and is broadcast around the world. "Abide with Me", sung before the game, has become a rugby league anthem.

The current holders of the Challenge Cup are Wigan, beating Huddersfield, 16–14 in the 2022 Final on 28 May 2022 at Tottenham Hotspur Stadium, winning the competition for the twentieth time.

Wigan are the most successful club in the history of the competition, winning the Cup a record 20 times.

History 

The clubs that formed the Northern Union had long been playing in local knock-out cup competitions under the auspices of the Rugby Football Union. The rugby union authorities refused to sanction a nationwide tournament, however, fearing that this would inevitably lead to professionalism. After the schism of 1895, the northern clubs were free to go ahead, and they started the Northern Rugby Football Union Challenge Cup. In 1896 Fattorini's of Bradford were commissioned to manufacture the Challenge Cup at a cost of just £60. Fattorini's also supplied three-guineas winners' medals then valued at thirty shillings (£1.50).

The first competition was held during the 1896–97 season (the second season of the new game), and 52 clubs entered to compete for the trophy. The first final was held at Headingley in Leeds, on 24 April 1897. Batley defeated St. Helens 10–3 in front of a crowd of 13,492 (see picture). The St Helens side did not play in a standardised team jersey.

The competition was later interrupted by the Great War, although it was held in 1915, when the season that had begun before the war was completed. It was then suspended until the end of hostilities. Initially, the final tie was held at one of the larger club grounds in the north, however, noting the excitement in Huddersfield that the town's football team were playing at Wembley in the FA Cup Final and the increasing difficulty for any of the rugby league grounds to satisfy spectator demand to see the final tie, the rugby league authorities voted 13–10 to move to the recently built Wembley Stadium in London, aiming to emulate the FA Cup's success and to put the game on the national stage.

The first final held at Wembley was in 1929 when Wigan beat Dewsbury 13–2 in front of a crowd of 41,500. At the start of the Second World War, rugby league suspended its season immediately, but the Challenge Cup took a single year's break before restarting, on a limited basis and with the support of the authorities, as part of keeping up morale. The Challenge Cup finals, which took place in the game's Northern heartland, got big crowds as the game raised money for prisoners of war and for Lord Beaverbrook's armaments programme.

In 1946, the Lance Todd Trophy was introduced and awarded to the man of the match. The first winner was Billy Stott of Wakefield Trinity while the first winner of the trophy on the losing team was Frank Whitcombe of Bradford Northern in 1948. In itself, it is a prestigious trophy presented only at the Challenge Cup Final. The winner is selected by the members of the Rugby League Writers' Association present at the game and the trophy was presented at a celebratory dinner at the Willows, the home of Salford.

The post World War Two Final crowds almost immediately reached capacity at Wembley – which amounted to multiple 90,000 plus crowds.

1954 saw the Challenge Cup final drawn and the replay set the record for a rugby league match attendance. The match was on 5 May and 102,569 was the official attendance at Odsal Stadium, although it is believed that up to 120,000 spectators were present to see Warrington defeat Halifax 8–4.

The first final that was played under limited tackle rules (Originally 4, later changed to 6) Was the 1967 final between Barrow and Featherstone Rovers.

Wigan became well known for their successes in the Challenge Cup competition, winning every Challenge Cup Final from 1988 to 1995.

Until the 1993–94 season there were very few amateur clubs included in the cup, typically two. For part of the 1980s, and the 1992–93 season the cup was solely for professional clubs. The competition was then opened up to large numbers of amateur clubs as part of a deal between the Rugby Football League and British Amateur Rugby League Association over bridging the gap between the professional and amateur leagues.

In 1997, a Challenge Cup Plate took place for teams knocked out in the early rounds of the competition. The final took place at Wembley and was won by Hull Kingston Rovers who beat Hunslet 60–14.

The first final that featured use of the Video Referee, for try decisions, was the 1999 final between Leeds Rhinos and London Broncos, which saw the Broncos beaten by a record margin of 52–16 in a Challenge Cup Final.

The 1999 Challenge Cup Final was also the last to be played at the old Wembley Stadium before the construction of the new Wembley Stadium began in 2003. During this time a variety of venues were used to hold the Final including Twickenham, Murrayfield and the Millennium Stadium. The Challenge Cup Final moved back into the new Wembley Stadium for the 2007 Final.

There was a belief that the Challenge Cup final taking place early in the season had led to a decline in the prestige of the cup, so the timing of the competition was altered in 2005

On 26 August 2006 St. Helens scrum-half Sean Long became the first player in the history of the Challenge Cup to collect a third Lance Todd trophy following his man-of-the-match performance in the final against Huddersfield. His other Lance Todd trophy wins came in the 2001 and 2004 Challenge Cup Finals.

On 25 August 2018, Catalans Dragons became the first non-English team to win the Challenge Cup as they defeated Warrington Wolves 20–14 at Wembley.

Format
The modern Challenge Cup has eight rounds prior to the final. Teams are seeded, entering at different stages. The precise format has altered slightly from year to year, however the current format is as follows:
 First round: Amateur teams from around the United Kingdom are invited to participate. Most of the teams are English and affiliated to BARLA.  Also included are, or have been, the national champions of the Irish, Welsh and Scottish rugby leagues; teams representing the British Army, Royal Navy, Royal Air Force, the police, and student rugby league teams.  Occasionally other teams have been invited such as the inclusion for 2019 of Serbian side Red Star Belgrade.
 Second round: The first round winners play again.
 Third round: The League 1 clubs enter the draw with the winners from the second round.
 Fourth round: The Championship teams enter the draw with the third round winners.
 Fifth round: The bottom four Super League teams enter the draw with the fourth round winners.
 Sixth round: The top eight Super League teams enter the draw with the eight fifth round winners.
 Quarter finals: Last eight.
 Semi finals: Played at neutral venue(s).
 Final: Played at Wembley Stadium, on the Saturday of the August bank holiday weekend until 2019; was moved to July from 2020 onwards but was played in May in 2022 and returned to an August date in 2023.

Venues

During the first round right through to the quarter finals the cup is hosted at the stadium of the team who has been drawn at home. The semi finals are hosted at neutral venues so there is no advantage for the home team. In the event of a draw in the final a replay will be played at a neutral venue somewhere else. The final is played at Wembley traditionally and was first played there in 1928–29 season. Before, the final had been held in different neutral venues, including Leeds, Huddersfield, Manchester, Wigan, Salford and Rochdale. The first Challenge Cup final was held at Headingley, Leeds between Batley and St. Helens in front of a crowd of 13,492.

Trophy

The Challenge Cup trophy was designed by silversmiths Fattorini & Sons of Bradford in 1897. The trophy stands 36 inches high, manufactured of solid silver and sits on a black ebony base approximately 8 inches deep.

Tony Collins, the Rugby Football League's archivist, stated in 2007 that, "Fattorini's weren't given any particular commission, just told to come up with something prestigious". The trophy cost £60. The average wage in 1897 was around £2 per week which suggests an equivalent 2007 price of £16,000, although Collins says, "if you wanted something made of silver and with that level of craftsmanship these days, it would be far more expensive. In terms of its subsequent value, the RFL got a bargain."

The trophy currently presented to the winners after the final is not the original which had to be withdrawn due to its delicate condition. As well as the silver wearing thin, it had lost its fluted top and the players on each of the handles had been damaged. The original Fattorini trophy was last presented at the 2001 Challenge Cup Final to St Helens captain Chris Joynt after his team had beaten Bradford. The original trophy is now stored at the RFL's headquarters at Red Hall and only used for promotional appearances.

The trophy used today was created by Jack Spencer (goldsmith) of Sheffield in 800 man-hours and is an almost exact replica of the Fattorini piece. One improvement made with the new version is that the small shields displaying each winning team and captain are now the same size, whereas they had been getting smaller as space ran out on the original. The new trophy's neck has been strengthened. The second trophy was first presented to Wigan, winners of the 2002 Challenge Cup Final.

The winners of the cup in looking after the trophy must "follow a certain code of practice," says Collins. When not in a secure cabinet, the trophy must always be in the presence of someone. When the trophy is taken out overnight, somebody must sleep in the same room and if taken in a car there must be two people in attendance. Collins reveals that, "When it went down to France for some Catalans publicity photos, it even had its own seat on the plane."

Awards

The Lance Todd Trophy, named in memory of Lance Todd, is awarded to the man-of-the-match in the Challenge Cup Final. The winner is decided each year by those members of the Rugby League Writers' Association present at the match.

The Trophy was first presented in 1946 to William "Billy" Stott of Wakefield Trinity.

Sponsorship 

The Challenge Cup has been sponsored since 1980, with the sponsor being able to determine the cup's sponsorship name. There have been eight sponsors with Betfred being the current sponsors.

The official rugby ball supplier is Steeden.

Notable events in finals 

The most tries scored in a final was 5 scored by Tom Briscoe (Leeds Rhinos v Hull KR in 2015), who also holds the record for most tries in total from one player (7 for Leeds, 2014 – 1, 2015 – 5, 2020 – 1) one ahead of Kevin Iro (6 for Wigan, 1988 – 2, 1989 – 2, 1990 – 2).

The first hat trick of tries in a final was scored by Robbie Paul for Bradford Bulls v St Helens in 1996. Three years later, Leroy Rivett scored 4 for Leeds Rhinos against London Broncos in 1999. Some players previously missed out on becoming the first to score a hat trick due to tries being disallowed, such as Martin Offiah (Wigan v Castleford in 1992), Tony Iro (Wigan v Halifax in 1988) & Kevin Iro (Wigan v Warrington in 1990).

Graham Rees scored the quickest Challenge Cup Final try after just 35 seconds for St Helens against Leeds in 1972.

The most famous final was the 1968 'Watersplash' game between Leeds and Wakefield Trinity. Due to a heavy thunderstorm both before and during the match, the pitch became totally waterlogged. In the final minute, with Leeds 11 – 7 in front, Wakefield winger Ken Hurst scored under the posts, and Don Fox (Who had already won the Lance Todd Trophy that day) had a match winning conversion to take in injury time. But due to the saturated pitch, he miskicked the ball, sending it wide of the posts. Despite a successful career for both club and country, Fox has always been remembered for that one infamous moment.

The first player to be sent off in a final was Syd Hynes, for Leeds against Leigh in 1971, for headbutting Alex Murphy. Hynes has always protested his innocence over the incident. Richard Eyres of Widnes was shown a red card for an off the ball elbow on Martin Offiah of Wigan in the 1993 final, and was banned for 6 games as a result.

Challenge Cup Finals 

In total, 26 different clubs have won the Challenge Cup and 30 different teams have appeared in the final. Wigan Warriors hold the record for most wins with 20 and have appeared in 33 finals. In 2007, Catalans Dragons became the first non English team to reach the final but lost to St. Helens.

§ Denotes club now defunct
± Denotes a non-English club.

The Double

In Rugby League, the term 'the Double' is referring to the achievement of a club that wins the Super League (Rugby Football League Championship First Division before 1996) and Challenge Cup in the same season. To date, this has been achieved by ten different clubs.

The Treble

The Treble refers to the team who wins all three domestic honours on offer during the season; Grand Final, League Leaders' Shield and Challenge Cup. To date seven teams have won the treble, only Bradford, St. Helens and Leeds have won the treble in the Super League era.

The Quadruple

The Quadruple refers to winning the Super League, League Leaders' Shield, Challenge Cup and World Club Challenge in one season.

All Four Cups

Winning all Four Cups referred to winning the RFL First Division Championship, Challenge Cup, County League and County Cup in one season.

Broadcast
The BBC first covered the final of this competition when Wigan beat Bradford Northern in 1948. At that time though the only TV transmitter was in London, so fans up North never got to see it. It was another four years before another final was covered when Workington Town beat Featherstone Rovers in 1952. The cup final was not broadcast on TV again until the 1958 final between Wigan and Workington Town since when it has been shown every year. The inception of Grandstand also saw coverage of earlier rounds start to be shown during the 1960s with ITV's World of Sport even showing games as well for a short period.

The BBC has been the predominant broadcaster, showing every final live since 1958 (except the 1982 Final Replay shown as highlights). Eddie Waring was the first commentator for BBC coverage. When he retired, commentary was covered by Ray French and he continued to work for the BBC for a number of years, albeit in semi-retirement, with his last Challenge Cup Final in 2008. From 2009, the present day main commentator is Dave Woods. He usually commentates with Brian Noble, Jonathan Davies, Iestyn Harris or Ian Millward. Nowadays, the BBC continues to broadcast the tournament with Clare Balding hosting from 2006 to 2012 until her move to Channel 4 Racing. Mark Chapman was secondary host in 2012 when Balding was unavailable for the cup and international matches, and previous hosts for the BBC include John Inverdale and Steve Rider. The current main hosts (as of 2013) are Mark Chapman and Super League Show presenter Tanya Arnold.

From 2012–2021, Sky Sports held the rights for the early rounds with one match each round and two quarter finals; whilst BBC Sport showed two sixth round matches, two quarter finals, both semi-finals and the final.

From 2022 onwards, Premier Sports will begin to broadcast games from the fourth round up to the quarter finals alongside BBC.

International

See also

Women's Challenge Cup
Wheelchair Challenge Cup
Amco Cup
Lord Derby Cup
British rugby league system
List of sports attendance figures
Super League

Notes

References

External links

 

 
Rugby league competitions in the United Kingdom
European rugby league competitions
National cup competitions